Trochilochaeta is a genus of parasitic flies in the family Tachinidae

Species
Trochilochaeta transcendens Townsend, 1940

Distribution
Brazil

References

Monotypic Brachycera genera
Endemic fauna of Brazil
Diptera of South America
Dexiinae
Tachinidae genera
Taxa named by Charles Henry Tyler Townsend